Wireline may refer to:

 Slickline, a cabling technology used for oil-well completions and maintenance
 Wireline (cabling), a cabling technology involving sending a current to downhole logging tools in oil-well exploration and completions
 Wireline (networking), networking technology
 Wireline (recording studio), a hybrid analog/digital recording facility in Midland, Texas
 Plain Old Telephone Service, a traditional land-line telephone system
 Wired communication